Qutb ad-Din Muhammad ibn al-Zangi was the Zengid Emir of Sinjar 1197–1219. He was successor of Imad ad-Din Zengi II.

See also 
 Zengid dynasty

References

12th-century births
1219 deaths

Year of birth unknown

Zengid rulers

12th-century monarchs in the Middle East

13th-century monarchs in the Middle East